California State Polytechnic University, Humboldt (Cal Poly Humboldt, Humboldt or Cal Poly) is a public university in Arcata, California. It is one of three polytechnic universities in the California State University (CSU) system and the northernmost campus in the system. The main campus, situated hillside at the edge of a coast redwood forest, has commanding views overlooking Arcata, much of Humboldt Bay, and the Pacific Ocean. It is the most westerly four-year university in the contiguous United States. Humboldt is an Hispanic-serving institution (HSI).

The university is divided into three colleges: the College of Arts, Humanities, and Social Sciences; the College of Natural Resources and Sciences; and the College of Professional Studies. It offers 48 bachelor's degree programs, 12 master's degree programs, 61 minors, and 13 credential programs. Cal Poly Humboldt does not offer doctoral degrees.

In addition to the main campus, Cal Poly Humboldt has multiple off-campus facilities and education-related properties, including an ocean-side marine biology research center, a wildlife care facility, a public natural history museum, a public art gallery, a bay-side aquatics facility, a mountain-top astronomy observatory, an ocean-going marine research and teaching vessel (Coral Sea), and a demonstration forest (Arcata Community Forest).

History 

Humboldt State Normal School was established as a teacher's college on June 16, 1913, by then-California Governor, Hiram Johnson. It was named after the famous German scientist Alexander von Humboldt. The cities of Arcata and Eureka (and to a lesser extent Fortuna) competed with one another to host the new campus. Arcata eventually won the university when William Preston, and the Union Water company, donated 55-acres. It opened on April 6, 1914, in the former Arcata Grammar School building with 78 students and 5 faculty. On May 26, 1915, the first commencement of the first graduating class occurred, a class of 15 women. The first graduate awarded their degree in 1915 was local historian Susie Baker Fountain, who went on to catalog much of Humboldt County history from 1850 to 1966. Baker was a columnist for the Blue Lake Advocate and her extraordinary, lifelong collection of newspaper clippings and images are available for viewing in HSU Special Collections.

The school was put under the jurisdiction of the California Department of Education, renamed Humboldt State Teacher's College and Junior College, and moved to its current location in 1921. In 1924, during the presidency of Ralph Waldo Swetman, the Associated Students and the Alumni Association were organized and The Foghorn, the first student newspaper, was published. Bachelor's degrees began being offered in 1927. The school was renamed Humboldt State College in 1935 and the next year the Lumberjack was adopted as its mascot. In 1937, the students opened a cooperative bookstore and soda fountain, which would exist for the next 40 years as the center of student life.

During World War II, Arcata's city defense council suggested camouflaging Founder's Hall, which is visible from the Pacific Ocean, so it would not be a target for Japanese submarines. The council made its request in 1942, but Founder's Hall was not painted until the spring of 1944. The building remained camouflage green until 1948. During WWII, President Arthur Gist corresponded back and forth with the hundreds of students who left Humboldt State College to serve in the war. Available for viewing in the Arthur Gist Letters at HSU Special Collections, there are over 1,000 letters from 365 servicemen and women writing to Gist for the duration of the war.

Graduate programs began being offered in 1947. Under President Siemens in 1952, HSU continued expanding by accepting students from abroad, including some from Yugoslavia, Germany, the Near East as well as US territories such as Samoa, Guam and Hawaii. KHSC, later KHSU, the first state college radio station in California, was established. In 1960, the college joined the newly formed California State College system. The junior college program, terminated at HSU in 1962, was re-established in 1964 at College of the Redwoods (CR) located at the southern edge of Eureka. CR is located only seventeen miles south of HSU, and the two institutions maintain a close working relationship, with many students transferring to HSU following graduation from CR.

Student activism on campus rose through the 1960s and early 1970s, peaking in a protest against the Vietnam War with about 800 students (out of 3,600) participating in demonstrations on October 15, 1969. This was followed by another protest with nearly 3,000 students who planned a strike after the Cambodian Incursion. With similar events across the state, Governor Reagan shut down the CSC system in May 1970 for 5 days. The 1970s also saw the rise of feminist, cultural, and LGBT groups, and though the Women's Center would be the only one to survive through the 1980s, most groups would reappear by the mid-1990s. The campus currently hosts a United Students Against Sweatshops group that is active in lobbying for ethical products and services on campus.

David Philips (HSU alum) established the Humboldt Film Festival in 1967. It is now one of the oldest student-run festivals in the world. In 1996 the annual Explorations in Afro-Cuban Dance and Drum workshop began being held on the campus every July. The workshop is the largest assemblage of Afro-Cuban folkloric masters in the United States, drawing students from across the country and around the world.

In 1972, the college was renamed California State University, Humboldt. However, it still continued to be popularly called "Humboldt State." Reflecting this, its name was simplified to Humboldt State University in 1974. Enrollment first reached 7,500 in 1974, and though it has increased to near 8,000 in years since, the university remains one of the smallest in the CSU system. Through the 1980s, mature students became a large part of Humboldt State's student body, and in 1986 40% of the students were over the age of 25. The number has since decreased to 30%.

In 1987 students and activists founded the optional Graduation Pledge of Social and Environmental Responsibility. The purpose of the Pledge is to encourage graduating students to be mindful of the social and environmental impacts of their employment as they enter the workforce or continue their education. Today over one hundred Universities and colleges worldwide use the Pledge to some extent.

Name 
The university was originally named after the famous German scientist Alexander von Humboldt and was founded as Humboldt State Normal College in 1913. The university held that name from 1935 when it was renamed Humboldt State College.

On May 23, 1972, fourteen of the nineteen CSU campuses were renamed to "California State University," followed by a comma and then their geographic designation.  The five campuses exempted from renaming were the five newest state colleges created during the 1960s.  The new names were very unpopular at certain campuses.  Over Dumke's objections, state assemblyman Alfred E. Alquist proposed a bill that would rename the San Jose campus back to San Jose State. A few years later, some other CSU campuses, alongside the Humboldt campus, also secured passage of similar legislation, and California State University, Humboldt was renamed Humboldt State University from 1974 until 2022.

On January 26, 2022, the university was officially renamed from Humboldt State University to California State Polytechnic University, Humboldt, becoming the third polytechnic university in the state. The change is backed by a $458 million investment from the state of California.

Academics 
The university is divided into three colleges: the College of Arts, Humanities, and Social Sciences; the College of Natural Resources and Sciences; and the College of Professional Studies. There are 48 undergraduate majors and 69 minors. The two largest majors are biology and art, both with over 20 faculty members and extensive facilities on- and off-campus. This CSU campus offers a wildlife undergraduate degree. There are several credential programs and twelve master's programs, of which natural resources and social work are the largest. The new Energy, Environment, and Society graduate program is unique to the CSU, and provides graduates with interdisciplinary training in engineering, economics, and climate policy.

The University Library supports students and faculty from all three academic colleges. Humboldt State University Press (now called the Press at Cal Poly Humboldt) was launched in 1991 to showcase research and scholarship across the campus. The Forestry department building's walls are completely paneled with different species of wood. The building was rebuilt in October 1980 after the original building was burned down. The original building stood for 17 years before an arsonist, whose identity is still unknown today, set the building on fire in 1979.

Cal Poly Humboldt is one of only two universities in California to offer a major in botany; the other is California State Polytechnic University, Pomona. Its botany program is the nation's largest undergraduate program. Cal Poly Humboldt is the only university in California to offer a degree in rangeland resources and wildland soil science. The Native American Studies major and the Oceanography major are also unique to the California State University system. The university offers unique minors including multicultural queer studies, scientific diving, and appropriate technology.

The university's location on the North Coast provides access to the Pacific Ocean, lagoons, marshes, estuaries, and the Fred Telonicher Marine Laboratory, which provides opportunities for "hands-on" experiences and research for the sciences. The Marine Lab was opened in 1966, the lab is open during the academic school year (mid August-mid May).

Cal Poly Humboldt's fire science program teaches modern techniques for managing wildfire, and an advanced training program is offered for Forest Service employees and similar professionals.

, Cal Poly Humboldt has an international student population that has quadrupled in the last five years. The International English Language Institute has worked alongside HSU for 22 years to help international students gain academic English language skills to further their academic pursuits and business careers.

The college of eLearning, & Extended Ed (CEEE) is a self-supporting outreach department of Cal Poly Humboldt that provides a variety of academic, professional development and personal enrichment opportunities. While the CEEE programs are open to almost everyone, there is an emphasis on providing access to those community members who are not matriculated students at the university. Non-matriculated students may take some regular university courses through the CEEE Open University program. High school students may take regular university courses through the CEEE High School Concurrent Enrollment Program. Also, those aged 60 and over may take regular classes through the Over 60 Program. There are also a variety of online degree programs offered through the college. The CEEE also offers a wide range of diverse and eclectic programs. Examples include music and art programs for children, the Osher Lifelong Learning Institute for those aged 50 and over, foreign language classes, travel-study programs, continuing education for teachers, MFT/LCSW, nurses, and law enforcement. In 1998 Humboldt State University opened the HSU First Street Gallery in Old Town Eureka, expanding community access to the university's cultural and fine arts programs. In 2007, the university further expanded its presence in Eureka with the opening of the HSU Humboldt Bay Aquatic Center, a $4.5 million aquatic facility on the bay in Old Town Eureka. Future plans include a new HSU Bay and Estuarine Studies Center. This new facility will be closer to the Coral Sea (in 2012 docked at Woodley Island, Eureka), the only vessel in a U.S. educational institution solely dedicated to undergraduate research.

Cal Poly Humboldt Professor Steve Sillett has conducted groundbreaking research on redwood forest canopies and was featured in a 2009 cover story in National Geographic. He holds the Kenneth L. Fisher Chair in Redwood Forest Ecology, the only endowed chair in the world dedicated to a single tree species.

Statistics 

 Average High School GPA: 3.2 (Fall 2015 Freshmen)
 SAT Middle 50%: 440–560 Reading, 430–550 Math (Fall 2013 Freshmen)
 ACT Composite Middle 50%: 18–24 (Fall 2013 Freshmen)
 Average Undergraduate Class Size: 25
 Average Graduate Class Size: 8
 Student to Faculty Ratio: 21.1

Student demographics 
As of fall 2018 Cal Poly Humboldt had the largest enrollment percentage of Native Americans and the third largest enrollment percentage of multiracial individuals in the Cal State system. 
 Number of enrolled students: 5,739
 Gender:
 59.0% Female
 41.0% Male
 Average Age 24

Rankings 

 Cal Poly Humboldt is one of the colleges profiled in The Princeton Reviews book, Colleges with a Conscience: 81 Great Schools with Outstanding Community Involvement. The school was selected because of its record of having excellent service-learning programs and its blending of academics with community work.
 U.S. News & World Report ranked Cal Poly Humboldt tied for 37th out of 127 schools in the Regional Universities (West) category for 2021, and in the same category also ranked it 17th best public school, 22nd best for veterans, 33rd for best value, and tied for 34th best for social mobility.

Student life 

The Humboldt Energy Independence Fund (HEIF) is unique to the CSU, and uses student fee money to fund renewable energy and energy efficiency projects on campus. HEIF provides a rare opportunity for students, faculty, and plant operations staff to work together collaboratively towards a goal of a lower-carbon and energy-independent future. Compost and recycling bins are more common on campus than trash cans and many events are encouraged to be zero waste, all coordinated through the student-run Waste Reduction and Resource Awareness Program (WRRAP). The Associated Students fund WRRAP, the Campus Center for Appropriate Technology, and the Sustainable Living Arts and Music Festival (SLAM fest).

Cal Poly Humboldt built the first building in the CSU system to be LEED-gold certified for its eco-friendly features. The Behavioral and Social Sciences Building has rainwater collection, sustainably harvested wood native-plant landscaping, and more.

The university's location affords students the potential for outside activities in local parks and public lands, which include miles of accessible, undeveloped coastline. Rivers and streams, forests, and extraordinary terrain are just outside the classroom door.

There are over 200 clubs on campus that students can join. Clubs on campus include a variety of options that range from social interests, academic, Greek life and sports.

Student media 
The university has multiple publications. The Lumberjack is the university's only student-run weekly newspaper.

The university also has a monthly student-run newspaper, El Leñador, which is bilingual and produced by students with minority backgrounds. It is a newspaper committed to promoting diversity in local media. El Leñador was named top non-weekly newspaper in the state. El Leñador received first place in competing against other monthly and bi-weekly papers from four- and two-year colleges and universities across California.

Osprey is the university's student-run magazine, published twice annually. It has won first-place awards in major regional competitions, including the Society of Professional Journalists' "Mark of Excellence" Awards and the California Intercollegiate Press Association awards.

Cal Poly Humboldt is also the only university in the CSU system to have a university press. The Press at Cal Poly Humboldt publishes high-quality scholarly, intellectual, and creative works by or in support of our campus community.

Greek life 
Chi Phi fraternity-Epsilon Zeta chapter
Delta Phi Epsilon
Gamma Alpha Omega sorority- Pi chapter
Kappa Sigma fraternity – Tau Beta chapter
Lambda Theta Alpha sorority – Epsilon Iota chapter
Lambda Theta Phi fraternity- Beta Omega chapter

Athletics 

The Lumberjacks' program is affiliated with the NCAA on the Division II level and is a member of the California Collegiate Athletic Association. Cal Poly Humboldt currently sponsors 12 intercollegiate sports programs — men's and women's soccer, basketball, cross country, track and field, women's volleyball, softball, rowing, and, formerly, football (in which it competed in the Great Northwest Athletic Conference).

In addition to NCAA sanctioned athletics, Cal Poly Humboldt also supports club sports including, archery, baseball, cheer, climbing, cycling, disc golf, fencing, logging sports, men's and women's lacrosse, men's and women's rugby, men's and women's ultimate Frisbee, men's crew, and men's volleyball.

Cal Poly Humboldt's softball team has qualified for the NCAA post-season 18 times between 1990 and 2008, capturing the NCAA Division II Softball Championship in 1999 and in 2008.

Women's (2)
Softball (2): 1990, 2008

On-campus housing 
On-Campus Housing consists of 6 living areas; The Hill, Cypress, Canyon, Creekview, College Creek and Campus Apartments. The north side of campus consists of The Hill, Cypress, The Canyon, and Creekview, which are considered primarily for first year traditional residents. The southside of campus, College Creek and Campus Apartments are placed for second year students, and non-traditional residents. College Creek consists of four three-level housing complexes separate.

Klamath Connection Program 
The Klamath River is the focus of the Klamath Connection, which is designed to help freshmen learn important skills for future science careers.

Y.E.S. House 
The Y.E.S. House (Youth Educational Services) is programs created by students and led by students volunteer programs. The Y.E.S. House serves the communities needs. There are currently running 17 programs. Students can volunteer for these programs and also have the ability to become directors as well.

Centers and institutes 
Centers and institutes at the university include:

 The California Center for Rural Policy at Cal Poly Humboldt is a research center to assist policy development. community building community, and promoting the health of rural people and their environments.
The mission of the Humboldt Science and Mathematics Center is to enhance science and mathematics education. It was chartered in 2005, and offers programs and professional support for teachers and for students preparing for the professionals. The center is formally affiliated with a number of university programs.
The Humboldt Institute for Interdisciplinary Marijuana Research (HIIMR) seeks to improve the economic, social, physical, and environmental health of individuals and communities through the interdisciplinary scientific study of marijuana. HIIMR designs, conducts, analyzes, and disseminates research; provides applied expertise to policy makers, researchers, health professionals, businesses, and the media; and archives and provides access to source materials (raw data, media).
Affiliated with the Department of Geography and its Kosmos Lab for teaching cartography, the Institute for Cartographic Design provides cartography students with an opportunity to engage in applied map design before graduation, provides a centralized cartographic design service on campus, in all formats from paper to web to animation.
The Institute of Health and Human Performance supports the local community in activities for health promotion. It supports research and training for faculty and students in health, human performance, disease prevention, physical activity and nutrition.
The Institute for Entrepreneurship Education is designed to reach other academic departments on campus as well as the Redwood Coast business community. It is oriented around interdisciplinary study, with a focus on social entrepreneurship and an ethic of social responsibility.
The Institute for Spatial analysis (ISA) is devoted to the expansion of spatial analysis methodologies in multiple disciplines and the real world issues. It works with both public and private sector entities.
The Schatz Energy Research Center (SERC) works to establish clean energy technology. It specializes in renewable energy, energy efficiency, and hydrogen energy systems, especially increasing the efficiency of fuel cells. Its work involves research and development, technology demonstration, project development, energy systems analysis, and education and training.
 Museum & Gallery Practices Certification Program

Notable people

Alumni 

 Marisa Anderson, guitarist and composer, dropped out at age 19
Taylor Boggs, former professional American football player
Melissa Braden, sculptor and ceramic artist
Dean L. Bresciani, President of North Dakota State University
Ellie Cachette, American technology executive, activist and author; first recipient of school's Recent Distinguished Alumni Award
Alex Cappa, current professional American football player for the Cincinnati Bengals
Raymond Carver, American short story author and poet
Po Chung, co-founder of DHL Asia Pacific and Chairman Emeritus of DHL Express (Hong Kong)
Mark Conover, winner of 1988 Olympic Marathon trials
Michael Crooke, businessman, former CEO of Patagonia, Inc.
Dan Curry, Emmy Award winner for work on Star Trek
Chris Dixon, former professional indoor American football player and coach
Trevor Dunn, bassist for Mr. Bungle and Fantomas
Jack Fimple, former Major League Baseball catcher for the Los Angeles Dodgers
Ken Fisher, billionaire CEO of Fisher Investments, long-time Forbes columnist, and author of books on investing
Ronald Alan Fritzsche, Marine Biologist
Harrell Fletcher, artist
David Gelbaum, businessman, green technology investor and environmental philanthropist
Dave Harper, former NFL linebacker
Wendell Hayes, former NFL running back
Danny Herrera, former powerlifter
Stephen Hillenburg, creator of Nickelodeon's SpongeBob SquarePants
John Kiffmeyer, former drummer for the rock band Green Day
Ian "Vaush" Kochinski, political YouTube livestreamer and debater
Jeffrey D. Levine, former United States Ambassador to Estonia
Clinton McKinnon, Mr. Bungle musician
Kassandra McQuillen, attorney and contestant on Survivor: Cagayan and Survivor: Cambodia
Michael Moore, member of the Instant Composers Pool
Mike Patton, musician, notable for his work with Faith No More, Mr. Bungle, and film scoring
Steve Selva, botanist and Professor Emeritus at the University of Maine
Monroe Spaght, research chemist, president and chairman of the Shell Oil Company
Marla Spivak, entomologist and professor at the University of Minnesota
Trey Spruance, Mr. Bungle and Secret Chiefs 3 musician
Josh Suggs, current Major League Soccer Defender; Colorado Springs Switchbacks FC
Micah True, ultrarunner and founder of the Ultramaraton Caballo Blanco
Martin Wong, American painter and ceramist

Faculty 
Don Gregorio Antón, Artist/Educator (Emeritus Professor)
Marcy Burstiner, journalist
Jim Dodge, novelist and poet
Stephen Fox (emeritus), historian, author, and educator
Ronald Alan Fritzsche (emeritus), ichthyologist, Outstanding Professor 1990-1991
Robert A. Gearheart (emeritus), environmental engineer
Victor Golla, (emeritus), linguist
Steven C. Hackett, economist
Eric Rofes, gay activist, feminist, educator, and author
Stephen C. Sillett, botanist

See also 
List of forestry universities and colleges
Campus Center for Appropriate Technology (CCAT)
Humboldt Institute for Interdisciplinary Marijuana Research (HIIMR)
Humboldt State University Natural History Museum

Notes

References

External links 

 
 Humboldt State Athletics website

 
Humboldt
1913 establishments in California
Arcata, California
Educational institutions established in 1913
California State Polytechnic University, Humboldt
Schools accredited by the Western Association of Schools and Colleges
Technological universities in the United States